Lookin' Ahead is the second album by The Jazz Crusaders recorded in 1962 and released on Pacific Jazz Records.

Reception

Writing for AllMusic, Scott Yanow wrote, "The tenor-trombone frontline created by Wilton Felder and Henderson, along with the funky yet swinging playing of pianist Joe Sample, drummer Stix Hooper and bassist Jimmy Bond on this hard-to-find set made the group instantly recognizable and surprisingly popular from the start".

Track listing 
 "Song of India" (Nikolai Rimsky-Korsakov) – 4:02
 "Big Hunk of Funk" (Wilton Felder) – 5:00
 "Tonight" (Leonard Bernstein, Stephen Sondheim) – 2:50
 "507 Neyland" (Wayne Henderson) – 3:56
 "Till All Ends" (Joe Sample) – 3:33
 "Tortoise and the Hare" (Sample) – 4:24
 "In a Dream"  (Henderson) – 3:20
 "Sinnin' Sam" (Stix Hooper) – 4:39
 "The Young Rabbits"  (Henderson) – 3:35

Personnel 
Wayne Henderson – trombone
Wilton Felder – tenor saxophone
Joe Sample – piano
Jimmy Bond – bass
Stix Hooper – drums

References 

The Jazz Crusaders albums
1962 albums
Pacific Jazz Records albums